The 1850 Grand National was, at the time, the 15th annual running of a handicap steeplechase horse race at Aintree Racecourse near Liverpool, England on Wednesday, 27 February 1850. It was later retrospectively recorded as the twelfth official running in 1864. It attracted a then record field of thirty-two runners and was won by the unconsidered Irish entrant, Abd El Kader.

Leading Contenders
Peter Simple was the long time favourite of the general public on the back of his winning the 1849 Grand National although there seemed to be some confusion over his ownership as most contemporary reports differ as to whose colours he was to carry. His trainer Tom Cunningham remained in the saddle, as he had been last year in victory. Contemporary reports stated that, in what proved to be Cunningham's second and final ride in the race, Peter Simple was stated by some contemporary newspaper sources as having finished the race in fifth position. Records of those that did not finish in the first three however were not officially recorded and modern records state that the horse did not complete the course. The proved to be Cunningham's final ride in the Grand National, although Peter Simple would return in 1851.

Sir John Was backed down to 7/1 to win in the colours of Lord Waterford, who himself had ridden in the 1840 Grand National and provided John Ryan with the best backed mount of the seventeen riders making their debut in the race. Ryan matched the owner's performance in the race by finishing third.

Rat Trap or Rattrap, as it was listed in some contemporary reports was the mount of John Frisby and was quoted at 9/1 on the course. The partnership did not complete the course, though it was not recorded what fate befell them.

The Victim was quoted at 12/1 by bookmakers and betting rooms. In the company of his rider, William Taylor, they failed to complete the course.

The Knight of Gwynne had finished second the previous year so was naturally well supported to improve on that performance. The horse this year ran in the colours of a Mr Fort and so had a new rider with the 1847 winning rider, Denny Wynne. The 12/1 shot again put in a good showing but was beaten before the winner came back into the view of those in the stands, running on gamely to finish second yet again.

The only other competitors that came under the consideration of the Bookmakers were Farnham and Vengeance at 13/1,  The 1848 winner Chandler was at 16/1 with Columbine, Maria Day, Little Fanny and The Oaks attracting the lesser public money.

Abd El Kader lay among the "any price these others" category as to be so unconsidered that the Bookmakers did not see fit to offer a price to the public. With Chris Green in the saddle they began attracting attention during the race with Bookmakers offering odds of 20/1 in running until it became gradually clear that the Irish entry might stay the course and win. Known as "Little Ab" due to his diminutive stature, the horse was a little under fifteen hands high. He would go on to become the first dual winner of the race and the first to win in consecutive years when repeating the feat in 1851.

Finishing order

No official returns for the Grand National exist prior to 1865. The return below is taken from the account published by the reporter of The Times newspaper the day after the race. Contemporary news reports agree only on the finishing order of the first three and none make any report of the fate of those that did not complete the course.

In Victorian horse racing, riders who fell from their mounts would have felt obliged and even encouraged to remount and continue the chase unless they or their horse suffered injury or the horse could not be caught. It is probable that most of the competitors completed the course in some shape or form but at such a long interval from the winner that their completion went totally ignored by the public.

In the 1980s the Reg Green book, A race Apart recorded just seven finishers, in the order below, omitting Peter Simple and Columbine however none of the known contemporary news reports support this.

The official records for Aintree racecourse state that the winner completed the course in a time of 9 minutes 57 seconds, making this the first sub ten minute Grand National, however none of the contemporary newspapers reports of the time support this information with the few that did record the time stating that it was won in a time of 10 minutes 20 seconds.

Non finishers

References

 1850
Grand National
Grand National
19th century in Lancashire
February 1850 sports events